Azade Namdari (30 November 1984 – 26 March 2021) was an Iranian actress and television presenter.

Controversy 
On 25 July 2017, a video emerged showing Namdari drinking beer without hijab during her vacation in Switzerland. The event drew a backlash on social media as she advocated black chador and compulsory Islamic dress code in Iran.

Death 
Azadeh Namdari died on 26 March 2021, at the age of 36.  According to Iranian news outlets, her body was discovered 48 hours after her death in her apartment in the Saadatabad area in western Tehran.
Mehr News Agency quoted an "informed source" as saying that the cause of death was suicide.

References

External links 
 

1984 births
2021 deaths
People from Sonqor
People from Tehran
Suicides in Iran
Iranian film actresses
Women television presenters
Iranian television producers
Iranian television presenters
Shahid Beheshti University alumni
Iranian television talk show hosts
Iranian women television presenters
Iranian radio and television presenters
Burials at artist's block of Behesht-e Zahra